The Eat Real Festival is an annual celebration of food organized by Food Craft Institute, in Oakland, California. The festival focuses on non-GMO, antibiotic-free food, and locally produced drinks made in a sustainable and organic manner. The festival typically includes more than 70 vendors from across the state. Entry to the festival is free and an estimated 150,000 people attend every year. In 2011, the Eat Real Festival was voted the best annual event in the readers' poll conducted by the East Bay Express for the Best of the Bay. All proceeds from the festival go to the Food Craft Institute.
The festival is a combination of a block party and street-food festival. Similar to state fairs, participants learn about the production of food, how it is made, and who makes it. The event focuses on the recruitment of food vendors that are affordable while emphasizing fresh and local ingredients.

History 
The festival was founded by the Food Craft Institute in 2008 to educate the public about how local food is grown, manufactured and prepared. The festival has subsequently hosted Oakland-based food entrepreneurs in September every year, including Blue Bottle Coffee, Hodo Soy, Burma Bear and Curry Up Now.

In 2019, it was held at the Jack London Square.

No festival is planned in 2020 as officials cited the COVID-19 pandemic as grounds for cancellation.

Events 
Events at the festival include performances from artists such as DJ Paul Gordon, DJ Aebi Dee, and DJ Sofa King Awesome. Workshops feature special culinary guests including celebrities such as Anya Fernald, Thomas Bowman, and Chauncy Yarngo.

Food 
Vendors offer an assortment of street foods, such as Falafel, curry, grilled meats, ice cream, cheeses, pickles, jams, and Charcuterie. Styles of food that are served include Southern BBQ, Korean BBQ, Asian, Mexican, and Hawaiian. Between 60 and 70 vendors participate in the festival each year and most, if not all, of the dishes sell for $5 and under.

References

Food and drink festivals in the United States
Culture of Oakland, California
Festivals in the San Francisco Bay Area
Food and drink in the San Francisco Bay Area